NA-68 Sialkot-III is a constituency for the National Assembly of Pakistan. It is made up of the Pasrur Tehsil.

Members of Parliament

2018-2022: NA-74 Sialkot-III

Election 2002 

General elections were held on 10 Oct 2002. Zahid Hamid of PML-Q won by 73,529 votes.

Election 2008 

General elections were held on 18 Feb 2008. Zahid Hamid of PML-N won by 62,362 votes.

Election 2013 

General elections were held on 11 May 2013. Zahid Hamid of PML-N won by 131,607 votes and became the  member of National Assembly.

Election 2018 
General elections were held on 25 July 2018.

See also
NA-67 Sialkot-II
NA-69 Sialkot-IV

References

External links 
Election result's official website
Delimitation 2018 official website Election Commission of Pakistan

74
74